Mount Miguel High School is a public, comprehensive high school located in Spring Valley, California and serves over 1,400 students in grades nine through twelve. Opened in 1957, Mount Miguel is the fourth of twelve high schools constructed in the Grossmont Union High School District. MMHS is the home of the Matadors, and the school colors are red and black.

Mount Miguel High School is accredited by the Western Association of Schools and Colleges (WASC) and is a 1990 California Distinguished School.

Matador Early College (MEC) 

Students in the MEC enroll in UC/CSU transferable college courses at Grossmont College or Cuyamaca College. They experience a college atmosphere, and are oriented to the process involved in enrolling in college, choosing classes, and completing college coursework.

Advancement Via Individual Determination (AVID) 

AVID is a college prep elective course designed to ensure that students are meeting all A-G requirements and are college-ready by the end of their senior year.
 100% of AVID seniors (2015) accepted into a four-year university
 MMHS AVID seniors are awarded over $250,000 annually in grants and scholarships
 Paid college tutors providing academic support

Activities 
MMHS has a wide variety of clubs, activities, academic enrichment, and student support for which students to get involved.

After school programs
 Driver's Education
 Baseball Club
 Softball Club
 Matadors United

Athletics

Mount Miguel's athletic teams, the Matadors, compete in the Grossmont Conference and the California Interscholastic Federation (CIF) - San Diego Section.

The school fields teams in the following sports: baseball, boys and girls basketball, cheerleading, boys and girls cross country, football, boys and girls soccer, softball, boys and girls swimming & diving, boys and girls track & field, boys and girls volleyball, boys and girls water polo, boys and girls wrestling.

Notable alumni 

Ryan Anthony, 1987, classical trumpet player
 Khalif Barnes, 2000, National Football League (NFL) offensive tackle, Jacksonville Jaguars, Oakland Raiders
 Robert Griffith, strong safety for the Arizona Cardinals
 Arthur Hobbs, defensive back for the Hamilton Tiger-Cats
 Jeff Karstens, 2000, starting pitcher for the Pittsburgh Pirates
"Shotgun Tom" Kelly, 1968, television personality
 Cory Littleton, middle linebacker Los Angeles Rams
 Bryant Mitchell, retired NFL player
 Ogemdi Nwagbuo, defensive lineman San Diego Chargers
 Ray Wells, NFL player

References

External links
Mount Miguel High School

Educational institutions established in 1957
High schools in San Diego County, California
Public high schools in California
1957 establishments in California